Muktir Gaan (The Song of Freedom) is a 1995 Bangladeshi documentary film directed by Tareque Masud and Catherine Masud. This is a documentary film which explores the impact of cultural identity on the Bangladesh Liberation War in 1971, where music and song provided a source of inspiration to the freedom fighters and a spiritual bond for the whole emerging nation.

Background 

During the Liberation War in 1971, a cultural troupe, named Bangladesh Mukti Sangrami Shilpi Sangstha used to travel to refugee camps and different areas in Mukta Anchal, perform patriotic songs, arrange puppet shows and stage dramas to inspire the freedom fighters and people with the spirit of war. Muktir Gaan, 25 years in the making. Tareque and Catherine used original footage by American film-maker Lear Levin, as well as other archival footage collected from the UK and India.

Crew 
 Tareque Masud, director, co-producer
 Catherine Masud, co-producer, editor
 Lear Levin, Cinematography

Synopsis 
In 1971 the people of East Pakistan (now Bangladesh) waged a war of liberation against West Pakistan, which ended in December 1971 with the foundation of the country of Bangladesh. The film Muktir Gaan is a special and rear archive of footage of this war. Firstly the footage taken by American filmmaker Lear Levin shot of a group of young musicians and actors who at the time travelled through the country with battle songs and political puppet shows. The film follows the group not only during their performances for refugees and guerillas but also during their travels, which has produced many melancholy pictures. Levin's material is available for the first time thanks to two filmmakers from Bangladesh who, being discontent with the present regime, wanted to remind the Bengal people of the initial motives of the war of liberation: freedom and democracy. The film was screened in Bangladesh where it was a resounding success.

Music 
The songs in Muktir Gaan have been sung by various singers of the country. The film also features Brig Gen (retired) Giasuddin Chowdhury, Aminul Haque Badshah and other nameless freedom fighters who fought for liberation of the country.
 Bipul Bhattacharjee
 Debobroto Chowdhury
 Dulal Chandrashil
 Laila Khan
 Lata Chowdhury
 Lubna Marium
 Mahmudur Rahman Benu
 Shaheen Samad
 Sharmin Murshid
 Swapan Chowdhury
 Tariq Ali

See also
 Artistic depictions of Bangladesh Liberation War
 Independent films of Bangladesh

References

External links
 
 

1995 films
1995 documentary films
Bengali-language Bangladeshi films
Bangladeshi documentary films
Films based on the Bangladesh Liberation War
Films directed by Tareque Masud
Films directed by Catherine Masud
Films shot in Bangladesh
1990s Bengali-language films